is a Japanese comedian.

Filmography

Television

References

Japanese impressionists (entertainers)
1988 births
Nippon Sport Science University alumni
People from Niigata Prefecture
Living people
Yoshimotozaka46 members